Zook is a Finnish rock band based in Helsinki, Finland. Their debut album, Root Canal Recovery, was released in January 2006. It charted at number 27 on the Finnish Top-40 charts.

Two of the band's members, Jukka Jylli and Sami Kuoppamäki were formerly members in the well-known progressive/psychedelic rock band Kingston Wall. Rocka Merilahti has played in Hurriganes' Remu Aaltonen's and Hanoi Rocks' Michael Monroe's  solo bands. Zook toured Finland from March 2, 2006 to April 29, 2006.

Discography

Singles 
Chemistry (2005)

Albums 
Root Canal Recovery (2006)

References

Finnish musical groups
Musical groups from Helsinki